Clyde Wyncham is a fictional character that has appeared or been referenced in Mark Millar's works Marvel 1985 and Kick-Ass, and his runs on Fantastic Four and Old Man Logan. Clyde Wyncham is notable in that he ties all of Mark Millar's recent runs together.

Origin
Clyde Wyncham was the first and only mutant of Earth 1219, a reality similar to our own. Clyde was so powerful he could control humans and bring the dead back to life. Despite his power, he was too young to control it. One night in 1964, he unwittingly coerced a crowd of people to surround his home, including his dead father whom he had unintentionally resurrected. Clyde's mother was so horrified that she struck him with a candlestick to get him to stop, resulting in permanent brain damage. His mother left him to live in an asylum from that point on.

Marvel 1985
Clyde has been in an institution ever since his mother's attack. The nurses left his comic book collection behind, which angered the vegetative Clyde. For payback, he summoned Marvel supervillains to his world, causing great death and destruction. Jerry Goodman steals a comic collection back from a comic shop, where the villains had sold it, in an effort to appease Clyde. Before Clyde can stop the villains, the Red Skull kills Jerry with a machine gun. Clyde is shocked and sends the Marvel villains home, shouting "EVERYBODY GO HOME NOW!" Jerry's ex-wife asks Clyde to bring Jerry back to life, but Clyde says he had promised his mother he "wouldn't do that trick no more."

In the aftermath of the event, Captain America offered to take Clyde back to the Marvel Universe, where scientists were more used to dealing with people like Clyde.

Fantastic Four
Though technically brain-dead, Reed Richards had Clyde placed in a holding cell in the Area 87 and created a cybernetic helmet designed to keep Clyde in a permanent state of pleasant dreams. However, during The Marquis of Death's attack The Thing released Clyde and pitted him against his corrupted future self. Clyde was defeated by The Marquis of Death but not before The Marquis had been severely weakened to the point that he could no longer fight back against his adversaries. Clyde had been returned to a state of unconsciousness during the fight and is presumed to have been taken back to Area 87 where he dreams pleasant dreams once more.

Powers and abilities
Clyde is capable of reality manipulation on a massive scale. He is immortal and can open portals to other dimensions/realities, time travel, resurrect the dead, manipulate matter, shapeshift, teleport, generate massive amounts of energy, project telepathic illusions, and mind control high-level cosmic entities. He is also highly durable as it took Planck temperature to defeat him after he was severely weakened from fighting.

Alternate versions
The Marquis of Death is a future incarnation of Clyde Wyncham from a parallel universe where he escaped his imprisonment from Area-87 and had his mind fully restored following an attack led by several incredibly powerful supervillains, all of whom he killed with but a thought.

Old Man Logan
Another future version of Clyde is the Doctor Doom of The Old Man Logan timeline.

References

Characters created by Mark Millar
Comics characters introduced in 2008
Marvel Comics mutants
Marvel Comics orphans